Jeffrey Allen Reimer is an American chemist, academic, author and researcher. He is the C. Judson King Endowed Professor, a Warren and Katharine Schlinger Distinguished Professor and the Chair of the Chemical and Biomolecular Engineering Department at University of California, Berkeley.

Reimer has authored over 250 publications, has been cited over 14,000 times, and has a Google Scholar H-index of 63. His research is primarily focused to generate new knowledge to deliver environmental protection, sustainability, and fundamental insights via materials chemistry, physics, and engineering. He is a recipient of the Humboldt Prize. He is the author of two books entitled, Chemical Engineering Design and Analysis: An Introduction, and Introduction to Carbon Capture and Sequestration.

Reimer is a fellow of American Association for the Advancement of Science, American Physical Society, and International Society of Magnetic Resonance, and a member of American Chemical Society and American Institute of Chemical Engineers,

Early life and education 
Reimer was born in Van Nuys, California. After graduating from Taft High School in 1972, he took a summer job at Universal Studies Tours where he was a custodian, then returning to Universal Studios Amphitheater for the summer of 1973. He then received his bachelor's degree in chemistry from the University of California, Santa Barbara in 1976, and a Doctorate in Chemistry from California Institute of Technology in 1981.

Career
Following his Doctorate, Reimer served as Postdoctoral Fellow at IBM T.J. Watson Research Laboratories, before joining University of California at Berkeley as Assistant and associate professor in 1982. He was then promoted to Professor at University of California at Berkeley in 1994. Since 1984, he has also served as Faculty Scientist at Ernest O. Lawrence Berkeley National Laboratory, and in 2006, he held a brief appointment at RWTH Aachen University as Mercator Professor of the Deutsche Forschungsgemeinschaft.

Reimer was appointed on the executive board of Council for Chemical Research in 2012, and became a Trustee of Franklin University Switzerland in 2014.

Research
Reimer has worked extensively to generate new knowledge to deliver environmental protection, sustainability, and fundamental insights via materials chemistry, physics, and engineering. He established a research laboratory that focuses on a broader application of NMR and EPR spectroscopy to materials physics and chemistry.

Electronic Materials and Spintronics
Reimer and his group pioneered the use of magnetic resonance in the study of defects in thin film amorphous semiconducting thin films. He studied the distribution of hydrogen in hydrogenated amorphous silicon using multiple nuclear-magnetic-resonance techniques. He also characterized hydrogenated defects in silicon thin films and observed the light-induced changes in the local bonding environments of dopant impurities. He published a paper in 1987 and explored the usage of light in terms of controlling nuclear spins in semiconductors, and the role of these methods in context of exploiting the near-perfectly polarized electrons generated by optical processes in the host material to effectively deliver high polarization to atomic nuclei in materials such as GaAs and diamond. His work with defects in diamond began with phenomenology and has evolved, with collaborators Alex Pines and Carlos Meriles, to discovery of Landau-Zener effects associated with NV- defects in diamond, leading to extraordinary nuclear hyperpolarization.

Gas Separations and Metal-Organic Frameworks
Reimer developed materials and membranes that enable energy-efficient separation of gas mixtures, and are required in the clean use of fossil fuels and in reducing emissions from industry. His research also focused on the separations that decrease  emissions from power plants and decrease energy consumption in gas separations used by industry and agriculture.” In his paper published in 2013, he demonstrated the synthesis of metal-organic framework, self-assembled polymers, and other nanostructured materials, and also discussed their characterization at the atomic level of structure and sorbate dynamics. Furthermore, he studied the state-of-the-art of  capture, transport, utilization and storage from a multi-scale perspective, moving from the global to molecular scales.

NMR Techniques and Instrumentation
In 2002, Reimer developed magnetic resonance (MR) sensors for pulp and paper processing applications under American Forest Products Association and DOE’s Office of Industrial Technology. He also constructed a pilot-scale chip prototype instrument and sent it to sensor manufacturers for commercial development. Furthermore, he developed a high throughput NMR relaxometer that yields nanoporous materials surface area with a robotic device, and later on extended the sensor concepts in his collaboration with Alex Pines towards “outside the magnet” and “outside the coil” detection.

Awards and honors
1985 - NSF Presidential Young Investigator Award
1987- AT&T Foundation Award 
1987 - Camille and Henry Dreyfus Teacher-Scholar Award 
1997 - Award for Chemical Engineering Excellence in Academic Teaching, American Institute of Chemical Engineers (AIChE)
1998 - The Donald Sterling Noyce Prize for Excellence in Undergraduate Teaching, UC Berkeley 
2000 & 2015 - Chemical Engineering Departmental Teaching Award, UC Berkeley
2002 - R. W. Vaughan Lecturer, Rocky Mountain Conference on Applied Spectroscopy
2002 - Distinguished Teaching Award, U.C. Berkeley
2008 - Otto M. Smith Lectureship, Oklahoma State University 
2006 –2011, 2013 - Warren & Katharine Schlinger Distinguished Professor, UC Berkeley
2009 - Fellow, American Association for the Advancement of Science
2010 - Fellow, American Physical Society
2011- Chair, Gordon Conference on Magnetic Resonance 
2012 - C. Judson King Endowed Chair in Chemical and Biomolecular Engineering
2012 - EAS Award for Outstanding Achievement in Magnetic Resonance
2013 - Fellow, International Society of Magnetic Resonance
2015-16 - Alexander von Humboldt Research Award, RWTH Aachen, Germany
2022 - 69th Annual G.N. Lewis Lectureship and Awardee 
2022 - The Berkeley Citation Award

Bibliography

Books
Chemical Engineering Design and Analysis: An Introduction (1998) ISBN 9781107494084
Introduction To Carbon Capture And Sequestration (2014) ISBN 9781783263288

Selected articles
Larsen, S. C., Aylor, A., Bell, A. T., & Reimer, J. A. (1994). Electron paramagnetic resonance studies of copper ion-exchanged ZSM-5. The Journal of Physical Chemistry, 98(44), 11533–11540.
Lobree, L. J., Hwang, I. C., Reimer, J. A., & Bell, A. T. (1999). Investigations of the State of Fe in H–ZSM-5. Journal of Catalysis, 186(2), 242–253.
Kong, X., Deng, H., Yan, F., Kim, J., Swisher, J. A., Smit, B., ... & Reimer, J. A. (2013). Mapping of functional groups in metal-organic frameworks. Science, 341(6148), 882–885.
McDonald, T. M., Mason, J. A., Kong, X., Bloch, E. D., Gygi, D., Dani, A., ... & Long, J. R. (2015). Cooperative insertion of CO 2 in diamine-appended metal-organic frameworks. Nature, 519(7543), 303–308.
Bui, M., Adjiman, C. S., Bardow, A., Anthony, E. J., Boston, A., Brown, S., ... & Mac Dowell, N. (2018). Carbon capture and storage (CCS): the way forward. Energy & Environmental Science, 11(5), 1062–1176.

References 

Living people
University of California, Santa Barbara alumni
California Institute of Technology alumni
UC Berkeley College of Chemistry faculty
Year of birth missing (living people)
Fellows of the American Physical Society